Annanagar Mudhal Theru is a 1988 Indian Tamil-language comedy drama film directed by Balu Anand. The film stars Sathyaraj, Prabhu, Ambika, Radha. It a remake of the 1986 Malayalam film Gandhinagar 2nd Street.

Plot 
Sivaraman, unable to find a good job, joins a colony as a Gorkha identifying himself as Ramsingh. Ambika lives in the colony with her daughter. Ambika's husband works abroad. A police officer (Jai Ganesh) comes to the colony along with his daughter Latha. Latha is none other than Sivaraman's ex-lover. A flashback is shown where Sivaraman and Latha are classmates and in love with each other. But Latha breaks up after a misunderstanding.

Seeing Latha after a long time, Sivaraman gets excited but Latha does not reciprocate. Ambika finds the real identity of Sivaraman and treats him with respect while other colony members ill treat him as he is just a security guard. The colony members also spreads rumour about Ambika having illegal affair with Sivaraman.
Anand, a cunning guy lives in the colony and sets an eye on Latha but gets beaten up by Sivaraman. Now the colony members turn against Sivaraman. But Ambika comes for rescue. Latha also understands that Sivaraman is still in love with her and decides to patch up with him.

Ambika's husband comes from abroad. The colony members speak ill about Ambika to Prabhu. But Prabhu does not believe those and trusts Ambika. It is revealed that Ambika has already informed Prabhu about Sivaraman and Prabhu has also arranged him a job abroad. The movie ends on a positive note with Sivaraman and Latha uniting.

Cast 
Sathyaraj as Sivaraman/Ramsingh
Prabhu Ramesh
Ambika as Geetha
Radha as Latha
Manorama as Colony Secretary
Thyagu as Constable
Janagaraj as Madhavan
Raghuvaran as Widowed Professor
Anand as Flirty son of Manorama and smuggler
Vennira Aadai Moorthy as Script Writer
T. S. Raghavendra as Smuggler
Jai Ganesh as Inspector Rajagopal

Soundtrack 
The music was composed by Chandrabose. The songs became chartbusters.

Release and reception 
Annanagar Mudhal Theru was released on 14 January 1988. The following week, N. Krishnaswamy of The Indian Express praised the performances of Janakaraj and Sathyaraj, but noted that, slowly the film "belies its distinctive start and sluds into tiresome cliches so well-beloved to Tamil cinema." Jayamanmadhan of Kalki gave a mixed review for various aspects, including the editing and inclusion of ingredients not relevant to the story.

References

External links 
 

1980s Tamil-language films
1988 comedy-drama films
1988 films
Films directed by Balu Anand
Films scored by Chandrabose (composer)
Indian comedy-drama films
Tamil remakes of Malayalam films